Jean Ernest Ducos de La Hitte, Viscount, was born on 5 September 1789 in Bessières (Haute-Garonne), and died on 22 September 1878 in Gragnague (Haute-Garonne). He was a French major general, Senator, Foreign Minister, and the implementer of the La Hitte system of rifled guns in 1858.

He entered the Ecole Polytechnique in 1807. He fought in Spain as an artillery lieutenant, in the campaigns of 1810, 1811, 1812, 1813 and 1814. He was in particular noticed at the siege of Cadiz.  He became Brigadier general on 22 February 1829, at 39 years of age. One year after (1830), he commanded the artillery in Africa during the capture of Algiers.

He was President of the Artillery committee during the Revolution of 1848. He became Minister for Foreign Affairs from November 1849 until 9 January 1851.

He created the La Hitte system of rifled muzzle-loading guns in 1858:

Notes

19th-century French diplomats
French Army officers
1789 births
1878 deaths
French Foreign Ministers
19th-century French military personnel
French military personnel of the Napoleonic Wars
École Polytechnique alumni